Michael or Mike White may refer to:

Academics
 Michael White (criminologist) (born 1951), professor of criminology at Arizona State University
 Michael White (psychotherapist) (1948–2008), inventor of narrative therapy
 Michael J. D. White (1910–1983), British zoologist
 L. Michael White, American theologian

Journalism and literature
 Michael White (author) (1959–2018), British science writer and novelist
 Michael White (journalist) (born 1945), associate editor and former political editor of The Guardian newspaper
 Michael K. White (born 1961), American writer
 Mike White (journalist), New Zealand investigative journalist, photographer and author
 Mike White (born 1972), journalist and filmmaker and host of The Projection Booth podcast

Music
 Michael White (clarinetist) (born 1954), New Orleans jazz musician
 Michael White (singer), country music artist
 Michael White (violinist) (1933–2016), jazz musician
 Michael White & the White, American hard rock combo and occasional Led Zeppelin tribute band
 Mick White (born 1967), English hard rock singer
 Trippie Redd (Michael White IV, born 1999), rap artist from Canton, Ohio

Sports
 Michael White (baseball) (born 1968), first-round pick by the L.A. Dodgers in the 1986 draft
 Michael White (bobsleigh) (born 1964), Jamaican Olympic bobsledder
 Michael White (cricketer) (1913–2003), English cricketer
 Michael White (footballer) (born 1987), Waitakere United player
 Michael White (snooker player) (born 1991), Welsh snooker player
 Mick White (Gaelic footballer) (Gaelic footballer) (born 1941)
 Mike White (American football coach) (born 1936), American football coach and former head coach
 Mike White (baseball) (born 1938), American baseball player
 Mike White (basketball) (born 1977), men's basketball head coach at the University of Georgia
 Mike White (defensive lineman) (born 1957), former American football player
 Mike White (quarterback) (born 1995), American football quarterback
 Mike White (softball) (born 1967), American softball coach

Theater, television, and film
 Michael White (producer) (1936–2016), British theatre and film producer
 Michael Jai White (born 1967), American actor and martial artist
 Mike White (filmmaker) (born 1970), film and television writer

Politics and law
 Michael White (judge) (born 1953), Irish High Court judge
 Michael D. White (1827–1917), member of the U.S. House of Representatives from Indiana
 Michael R. White (politician) (born 1951), former mayor of Cleveland, Ohio

Others
 Michael White (businessman), owner of the Rite-Hite company
 Michael White (British Army officer) (1791–1868), British Army general
 Michael White (chef), American chef
 Michael R. White (U.S. veteran), U.S. Navy veteran imprisoned in Iran

See also
 Michael Whyte (disambiguation)
 Michael Wight (born 1964), cricketer